Norman Fisher may refer to:

 Sir Norman Fenwick Warren Fisher (1879–1948), British civil servant
 Norman Fisher (architect) (1898–1949), South Australian architect, inaugural member of the Architects Board, with Herbert Jory
 Norman Fisher (educationalist) (1910–1972), British educationalist
 Norman Fisher (boxer) (1916–1991), New Zealand boxer
 Norman Fisher (public servant) (1936–1997), Australian civil servant

See also
 Norman Fisher-Jones (born 1962), known primarily as Noko, English musician
 Zoketsu Norman Fischer (born 1946), American poet, writer, and Soto Zen priest
 Norman Fischer (cellist) (born 1949), American cellist